Francis Alfred Suttill DSO (born, France, 17 March 1910 – executed, c. 23 March 1945), code name Prosper, was an agent of the United Kingdom's clandestine Special Operations Executive (SOE) organization in World War II.  Suttill was the creator and organiser (leader) of the Physician or Prosper network (or circuit) in and around Paris, France, from October 1942 until June 1943. The purpose of SOE was to conduct espionage, sabotage and reconnaissance in occupied Europe and Asia against the Axis powers, especially Nazi Germany. SOE agents allied themselves with French Resistance groups and supplied them with weapons and equipment parachuted in from England. 

Under Suttill's leadership the Prosper network was SOE's most important network in France, notable for its rapid growth, wide circle of contacts and collaborators, and the geographical reach of its operations "from the Ardennes to the Atlantic." The fall began in April 1943 and was as fast as its rise. The network was too large, diverse, and security too lax.  The Germans penetrated and used Prosper for their own purposes.  The Air Operations officer for Prosper, Henri Déricourt, would later be accused of being a double agent for the Germans. Maurice Buckmaster, the leader of the French section at SOE's London headquarters, failed to recognize clear signs that the Germans had infiltrated Prosper.  

In what has been called SOE's "catastrophe of 1943," Suttill was captured by the Germans on 24 June 1943 and later executed. By the end of August 1943, the Germans had captured many of the nearly 30 SOE agents associated with him and hundreds of local French people working with or cooperating with SOE. Many were killed, executed, or died in concentration camps.

Early years
Suttill was born in Mons-en-Barœul near Lille, France, to an English father, William Francis Suttill, and a French mother, Blanche Marie-Louise Degrave. His father managed a textile manufacturing plant in Lille. Suttill studied at Stonyhurst College, Lancashire, England. For the school year 1927/8, he attended the College de Marcq in Mons-en-Barœul, gaining his Baccalauréat. He then read law at the University of Lille and was accepted as an external student at University College London. In 1931, he moved to London to continue his studies and eventually became a barrister at Lincoln's Inn. He married Margaret Montrose in 1935 and had 2 sons.

Suttill suffered from polio as a child and one leg was shorter than the other although he could walk without a limp.

World War II

Prosper Network

In May 1940, Suttill was commissioned into the East Surrey Regiment of the British Army. He was recruited and trained by SOE during the summer of 1942. Charismatic and a natural leader, Suttill was considered by SOE to be "highly resourceful and smarter than most" and thus chosen for its "most challenging job: to establish a circuit in Paris, covering a vast chunk of central France."  His network was named Physician, although more commonly was called by his code name of Prosper.

Earlier SOE networks, Carte and Autogiro, led by Frenchmen André Girard and Pierre de Vomécourt respectively, had been destroyed by the Germans. Suttill's job was to build a network under British control on their remnants. With the allied invasion of North Africa approaching, and tentative (but unrealized) plans for an invasion of France in 1943, SOE Section F (France) leader Maurice Buckmaster in London envisioned a strong resistance network based in Paris to harass the German occupiers of France.   

On 24 September 1942, Suttill's courier, Andrée Borrel, code names Denise and Monique, parachuted into France to prepare for his arrival. He himself parachuted into France on 1 October 1942 near La Ferté-sous-Jouarre. Suttill was fluent in spoken French, but had an accent and he relied on Borrel, already experienced in the resistance, for much of his communication. After meeting in Paris, Suttill and Borrel took a month long trip around central France, exploring the potential for setting up resistance networks.  They posed as an agricultural salesman and his assistant. Their early successes and high level of activity led SOE to send them two wireless operators, Gilbert Norman (Archambaud) in November, and Jack Agazarian (Marcel) in December. Most SOE networks had only one wireless operator. 

During late 1942 and the first half of 1943, the Prosper network grew rapidly, covering a large part of northern France, and involving hundreds of locally recruited agents and some 60 networks and sub-networks. SOE headquarters in London was both surprised and elated at the rapid progress of Prosper, although concerned about its connections with the communists who were especially powerful in the northern suburbs of Paris.  SOE, Suttill, and the French Resistance groups had the expectation that an allied invasion of France would occur in fall 1943. The efforts of Prosper and its sub-networks were directed toward becoming a potent resistance force to aid the proposed invasion. Suttill stockpiled arms and ammunition parachuted in from England to that end.

Déricourt and air operations
 
As the air movements officer for Prosper, Déricourt was charged with finding farm fields suitable for landing small aircraft from England and arranging for the embarkation or disembarkation of SOE agents. He collected mail and reports, often written in plain text rather than coded, from the agents and delivered messages to them. He was unusually successful and efficient. He accomplished the dangerous tasks of arranging clandestine aircraft landings and the reception and departure of agents without problems.  

Parachute drops of weapons and supplies arranged by Déricourt began in March 1943. Parachute reception teams and drop areas were in the Ardennes in Belgium, near Falaise in Normandy, three areas around Le Mans and two around Troyes, soon to be taken over by the Tinker network. Also, both the Privet network around Nantes and the Musician network around Saint-Quentin, Aisne were originally part of the Physician network. There were two main clusters: one in the Vernon/Beauvais/Meru triangle to the northwest of Paris and the other between Tours, Orléans and Vierzon, an area known as the Sologne between the rivers Loire and Cher.

Security
In April 1943, Benjamin Cowburn, an experienced and careful agent, delivered radio crystals to Suttill in Paris. Cowburn described Suttill as having a "dynamic personality" and  said that "the small world of the resistance rallied to a strong personality."  He also saw problems with security and remarked that a large number of SOE agents and their French contacts were going in and out of the same apartment.  Suttill responded that SOE headquarters kept sending people to him who needed help and that the address of the apartment had been passed around by agents.  The size and scope of Prosper violated SOE doctrine that agents in different networks should have no contact with each other and even that agents in the same network should rarely meet, but rather communicate through intermediaries or letter-drops. Suttill, however, was running a large organization in which contacts among SOE agents were extensive. Security was loose. Norman, Borrel, and Agazarian and his wife, Francine, met frequently to play poker at a Paris cafe. The remnants of the Carte network which were folded into Prosper included at least one German agent.  Moreover, the German Gestapo and Abwehr were becoming more expert at rooting out SOE agents and their French collaborators. The consequence would be the capture of Suttill and many of his agents and the destruction of the Prosper network.

German destruction of Prosper

On 22 April 1943, the Tambour sisters, Germaine and Madeleine, long-time members of the French Resistance were arrested in Paris. Suttill, through an intermediary, attempted to buy their release with a one million franc bribe, but the Germans deceived him by releasing two prostitutes rather than the Tambour sisters. The danger of the arrest to Prosper was that ten of its agents had used the house as a letter-box and meeting place, far more than prudence dictated.  

On 15 May 1943, Suttill returned to London for unknown reasons. He was parachuted back in France over Romorantin, now Romorantin-Lanthenay, on 21 May 1943, with another SOE agent, France Antelme.  On his return, his confidence seemed shattered.  He feared that Prosper had been penetrated by the Germans, and he was highly critical of the ignorance of SOE personnel in London about the conditions he faced in the field. Arrests of people in Suttill's network began to multiply and concerns of betrayal heightened. On 19 June, Suttill sent a bitter message to London blaming SOE for the near-arrest of his newest wireless operator, Noor Inayat Khan, by directing her to a compromised letter-box. He cancelled all passwords and letter-boxes.    

On the night of 15-16 June, two SOE agents, Canadians John Kenneth Macalister and Frank Pickersgill, were dropped to one of sub-network leader Pierre Culioli's reception sites. On the morning of 21 June, Culioli and his courier, Yvonne Rudellat, set off with the two Canadians to catch a train to Paris unaware that the Germans had set up extensive roadblocks. They were caught and the Germans found packages of letters and instructions and radio crystals in the car, two of which were clearly labelled "For Archambaud". This led the Germans to Archambaud (Gilbert Norman, Suttill's wireless operator) because, as Culioli admitted after the war, he had the address of Archambaud in his briefcase when he was caught. Shortly after midnight of 23 June, a German officer pretending to be one of the recently parachuted Canadian agents came to the apartment where Norman was staying and he and Andrée Borrel were arrested. The apartment was full of identification cards and other documents. The Germans learned, presumably from the documents or from one of those arrested, where Suttill was and he was arrested mid-morning on 24 June where he was staying in a cheap hotel.

The arrests continued. On 1 July Jean Worms, head of the Juggler Network, and Armel Guerne, Suttill's de facto second in command, were arrested in a Paris cafe where Worms ate lunch every day. Over the next three months, hundreds of local agents associated with Prosper were arrested, of whom 167 are known to have been deported to Germany where about one-half were executed, killed, or died in concentration camps. The communists in the Paris suburbs with whom Suttill worked mostly survived the debacle because of their rigid security practices and their dependence on SOE only for arms and money, and not guidance and communications. The survivors of the Prosper Network were mostly in the sub-networks of Prosper scattered around northern France. One temporary survivor was newly-arrived wireless operator Inayat Khan who was not captured until 13 October.

Buckmaster's blunder
On 25 June, an agent in Paris radioed SOE headquarters in London that Suttill, Norman, and Borrel "had disappeared, believed arrested." Thereafter, there was radio silence from Paris about the fate of Suttill until 7 July when a message from Gilbert Norman's radio arrived in London. The message confirmed that Suttill had been captured, but apparently Norman was still at large and transmitting.  However, the message was strange. It was distorted, but that could have been caused by atmospheric conditions.  The style of transmitting, the "fist," was different than the usual for Norman, and, most importantly, both the "bluff" and "true" checks were missing from the message. These checks were spelling mistakes or phrases deliberately inserted into a message by a wireless operator to prove that it was indeed he or she who was transmitting.  The absence of the checks in a message meant the operator or the radio, or both, were under the control of the Germans and transmitting under duress. Norman had a high reputation for efficiency and character and SOE's French section leader, Maurice Buckmaster, refused to believe that he had been captured. He sent back a message to Norman's radio saying, "You have forgotten your double security check.  Be more careful next time." Buckmaster had inadvertently told the Germans how to transmit messages to SOE which would be accepted as genuine.

Funkspiel
Dr. Josef Goetz was the wireless expert at 84 Avenue Foch in Paris, the headquarters of the Sicherheitsdienst (SD), the security service of the German SS. When wireless operator Gilbert Norman was captured on 23 June, the Germans also captured his wireless set.  With this wireless, and others soon captured, including that of Noor Inayat Khan, and after Buckmaster's blunder on 7 July, Goetz was able to play radio games ("Funkspiel") with SOE headquarters. He sent false messages to SOE which were accepted as genuine. For months, Goetz persuaded SOE that the Prosper network was still active and functioning. The practical results were that Goetz deceived SOE into air-dropping arms and equipment into German hands and, with details of their travel, the Germans captured 17 SOE agents immediately upon their arrival in France. 

By 6 June 1944, the date of the Normandy invasion, the radio game was worn out, but the Germans could not resist taunting the British.  Although Goetz protested, the German government ordered Josef  Kieffer head of the SD in Paris, to wire his opposite number, Maurice Buckmaster, at SOE. Kieffer drafted and sent a message saying:We thank you for the large deliveries of arms and ammunition which you have been kind enough to send us. We also appreciate the many tips you have given us regarding our plans and intentions which we have carefully noted. In case you are concerned about the health of some of the visitors you have sent us you may rest assured they will be treated with the consideration they deserve.

Most of the SOE "visitors" captured by the Germans were executed.

Suttill's pact
Some authors report that after their arrest Suttill or Norman or both made a pact with SD head Josef Kieffer.  The terms were that, if Suttill or Norman told the Germans where their caches of arms were located, captured SOE agents would be treated as prisoners of war and not executed as spies. Whether such a pact existed has been debated by historians. A SOE agent, Marcel Roussot (one of the few SOE agents captured by the Germans who survived), told SOE that he had met Norman at 84 Avenue Foch and Norman told him that both he and Suttill had made a pact with Kieffer to tell everything to save their lives. Norman advised Roussot to do the same. SOE's Vera Atkins interviewed Kieffer after the war while he was on trial for war crimes. Atkins' report did not confirm that such a pact existed.  She was uncustomarily vague about this all-important question.  She reported only that Kieffer said that Suttill "did not want to make a statement" and not whether or not he did.  She also reported that Kieffer said that Norman "had not the character of" Suttill, which gives the impression that Norman was the more malleable of the two. At the time of this interview in 1947, accusations were being made by the French that Suttill had sold out his French followers. Atkins and SOE neither confirmed nor denied this accusation. Suttill's family was bitter at the lack of support they received from SOE. 

If a pact existed, the Germans violated it as many SOE agents and French collaborators were executed.

Déricourt's deception
The role of Henri Déricourt, Suttill's air movements officer, in the destruction of the Physician/Prosper network is much debated. Déricourt, as mentioned above, arranged for the arrival and departure of SOE agents by air and collected their mail, including their uncoded reports, for transmittal to London. He was highly successful in these duties, but doubts about him began to be expressed in June 1943, at about the same time that Germans had begun destroying the Prosper network.  Several SOE agents communicated that "Gilbert is a traitor," but it is unclear whether they were talking about Déricourt, code named Gilbert, or Gilbert Norman who had been captured by the Germans. In October 1943, Henri Frager, a veteran resistance leader, flew to London specifically to denounce Déricourt as a traitor. Déricourt, however, enjoyed the support of SOE French section leader Buckmaster and his deputy, Nicolas Bodington. 

What Déricourt appears to have done was to copy the letters and reports which agents gave him for transmittal by airplane to England and give them to the Germans. The Germans learned much about the Prosper network and individual agents, which facilitated the arrests of agents and the destruction of the network.  Moreover, interrogators such as Kieffer were able to weaken the resolve of captured SOE agents by revealing how much the Germans knew about them personally. After World War II in 1948, Déricourt was put on trial in Paris. Nobody who had worked for SOE showed up to testify against Déricourt, but Bodington testified in his defense. He said Déricourt's contacts with the Germans were known to the SOE and that Déricourt was loyal to the allies. Déricourt was acquitted. This was not the first time that Bodington had defended Déricourt, which ignited doubts of Bodington's loyalties. Déricourt was killed in Laos in a crash of a plane he was piloting on 21 November 1962; Bodington died on 3 July 1974.

Conspiracy theories
An oft-cited theory is that Suttill and his Prosper colleagues were deliberately sacrificed by the British to mislead the Germans about allied plans for the invasion of Nazi-occupied Europe. The British reasoning behind the deception was that if the Germans anticipated an invasion of France in 1943, they would maintain or expand their occupation forces in western Europe, rather than sending resources east to combat the advancing Soviet Army. According to the theory, Suttill, during his mysterious visit to London in May 1943, was told or given the impression that the invasion of Europe would take place in 1943. Thus, on Suttill's return to France the Prosper network accelerated its efforts to organize resistance to the German occupation. The British betrayed Suttill and his SOE associates, the theory goes, because, after being captured and tortured, the British anticipated that Suttill and other SOE agents would tell the Germans that a 1943 allied invasion of Europe was imminent. British Secret Intelligence Service (SIS) deputy leader Claude Dansey, who was known to oppose the existence of SOE, has been identified as the perpetrator of the deception scheme and alleged betrayal.  

The conspiracy theory was debunked by Foot and by Suttill's son, Francis J. Suttill. The SOE historian, M.R.D. Foot said, "if you can believe that, you can believe anything." He said the theory was implausible. Suttill concludes that "the arrest of my father was the consequence of a series of unfortunate events, not the result of any betrayal as part of a deception plan."

Execution and honours
After his capture on 24 June 1943, Suttill was imprisoned and interrogated at Sicherheitsdienst (SD) headquarters at 84 Avenue Foch in Paris and later sent to Sachsenhausen concentration camp near Berlin where he was held in solitary confinement in the prison block until he was hanged or shot about 23 March 1945. He was awarded the Distinguished Service Order posthumously. Francis Suttill is honoured on the Commonwealth War Graves Commission Memorial at Groesbeek in the Netherlands and also on the Roll of Honour on the Valençay SOE Memorial in Valençay, in the Indre department of France. A biography of Suttill titled Shadows in the Fog by his son, Francis J. Suttill, was published in 2014.

See also
 Timeline of SOE's Prosper Network

References

Further reading
 Henri Noguères – Histoire de la Résistance en France de 1940 à 1945, Robert Laffont, 1976.
 Hugh Verity – We Landed by Moonlight, (revised edition). Manchester: Crecy Publishing, 2000.
 Anthony Cave Brown – Bodyguard of Lies: The Extraordinary True Story Behind D-Day , 1975.
 M. R. D. Foot – S.O.E. in France, Frank Cass Publishers, 2004 (first published London, HMSO 1966). Official history.
 Stella King – Jacqueline, Arms and Armour, 1989.
 Sarah Helm – A Life in Secrets: The Story of Vera Atkins and S.O.E's Lost Agents, Little, Brown, 2005.
 Marcel Ruby – La guerre secrete : les reseaux buckmaster, France Empire, 1991.
 Paul Guillaume – La Sologne au temps de l'heroisme et de la trahaison,, Imprimerie Nouvelle, Orléans, 1950.
 Francis J Suttill – Shadows in the Fog : The True Story of Major Suttill and the Prosper French Resistance Network, The History Press, 2014. .
 Suttill, Francis J (2023). "Was the Prosper French resistance circuit betrayed by the British in 1943?". Intelligence and National Security.

External links
Biography of Francis Suttill at Nigel Perrin's site

1910 births
1945 deaths
People from Nord (French department)
English Roman Catholics
East Surrey Regiment officers
British Special Operations Executive personnel
French Special Operations Executive personnel
Companions of the Distinguished Service Order
People educated at Stonyhurst College
People who died in Sachsenhausen concentration camp
Members of Lincoln's Inn
British Army personnel killed in World War II
British people executed in Nazi concentration camps
French people executed in Nazi concentration camps
Executed people from Nord-Pas-de-Calais
20th-century British lawyers
English people of French descent
Special Operations Executive personnel killed in World War II